This battle took place on 18 May 1657 and was a victory for the Republic of Venice over the main Ottoman Navy and the fleet of the Ottoman province of Algiers. Not many details are known.

Ships involved

Venice
Capitana d'Algeri (ex-Algerian Perla, captured earlier that year)
Arma di Midelborgo
Pomerlan
Arma di Colognia

Ottomans
14 saiks - Captured

References
 

Conflicts in 1657
1657
Naval battles involving Ottoman Algeria